Trifurcula orientella is a moth of the family Nepticulidae. It is found from Portugal and southern France across Liguria and Slovenia and southern central Europe to Greece.

The larvae feed on Genista germanica, Genista hispanica, Genista sylvestris and other small, mostly thorny Genista species. They mine the stems of their host plant.

External links
Seven Nepticulidae new to the Iberian Peninsula and several new province records (Lepidoptera: Nepticulidae)

Nepticulidae
Moths of Europe
Moths described in 1953